The 1995 Seattle Seahawks season was the franchise's 20th season in the National Football League (NFL), the 20th playing their home games at the Kingdome and the first under head coach head coach Dennis Erickson. They were able to improve on their 6–10 record and finished the season 8–8, however missing the playoffs for the seventh consecutive season.

1995 NFL Draft

Personnel

Staff

Final roster

     Starters in bold.
 (*) Denotes players that were selected for the 1996 Pro Bowl.

Schedule

Preseason

Source: Seahawks Media Guides

Regular season

Bold indicates division opponents.
Source: 1995 NFL season results

Standings

Game summaries

Preseason

Week P1: vs. St. Louis Rams

Week P2: vs. Indianapolis Colts

Week P3: at New Orleans Saints

Week P4: at San Francisco 49ers

Regular season

Week 1: vs. Kansas City Chiefs

Week 2: at San Diego Chargers

Week 3: vs. Cincinnati Bengals

Week 5: vs. Denver Broncos

Week 6: at Oakland Raiders

Week 7: at Buffalo Bills

Week 8: vs. San Diego Chargers

Week 9: at Arizona Cardinals

Week 10: vs. New York Giants

Week 11: at Jacksonville Jaguars

Week 12: at Washington Redskins

Week 13: vs. New York Jets

Week 14: vs. Philadelphia Eagles

Week 15 at Denver Broncos

Week 16: vs. Oakland Raiders

Week 17: at Kansas City Chiefs

References

External links
 Seahawks draft history at NFL.com
 1995 NFL season results at NFL.com

Seattle
Seattle Seahawks seasons
Seattle